Palay Khan is a 1986 Indian Hindi-language film directed by Ashim Samanta and produced by Shakti Samanta under his own production Shakti Films. It stars Jackie Shroff, Poonam Dhillon, Farah in pivotal roles. The music was composed by R. D. Burman. Palay khan was a favourite script lying with Shakti Samanta from mid 70s and he announced the movie with Rajesh Khanna but he could make the movie in the mid 80s only.

Plot 
The British government have taken over there rule in a deserted region in India. But some of the people there strive for freedom; one of those brave freedom fighters is Palay Khan, who owes his intelligence to the entire region. When British soldiers attack, he is always present to defend, and now he and his gang are wanted by the British, no stone is left unturned to catch him, but all ways prove futile until one day, a British officer by the name of Gulbaaz Khan manages to abduct one of Palay Khan loyal associates, Amar Singh and held him captive until Palay Khan surrenders. But in retaliation, Palay and his gang kidnap Helen, the daughter of British General Bonz, but eventually, Palay and Helen fall in love. This love might as well bring about the change in hatred for love between the British government and the freedom fighters.

Cast 
 Jackie Shroff as Palay Khan
 Poonam Dhillon as Zulekha Khan
 Farah as Helen Bonz
 Suresh Oberoi as Dr. Ramkrishna Sinha
 Puneet Issar as Amar Singh
 Shakti Kapoor as British Officer Mohammed Gulbaaz Khan
 Anupam Kher as British General Bonz
 Raza Murad as Khan Ali Hassan Khan
 Sushma Seth as Fatima Khanam
 Dinesh Thakur as Qazi Alimuddin Shah
 Satyen Kappu as Gangadin
 Kamal Kapoor as Military Court Judge
 Tom Alter as Military Court Official
 Bob Christo as British Officer Smith
 Manik Irani as British Officer Tegh Ali Khan
 Mac Mohan as Karimuddin Khan
 Roopesh Kumar as Mohammed Jamaal Khan

Soundtrack
The music for the film was given by R. D. Burman while Anand Bakshi wrote the lyrics for the film. The soundtrack was released by Saregama.

See also
 List of Asian historical drama films

References

External links 

1986 films
1980s Hindi-language films
1980s action drama films
1986 action thriller films
Films set in the 19th century
Films set in the British Raj
Films set in the Indian independence movement
Indian action thriller films
1980s historical thriller films
Indian action drama films
Films scored by R. D. Burman
Indian biographical drama films
Films directed by Ashim Samanta
Indian historical thriller films
Indian historical action films